Huarmaripayoc (possibly from Quechua wamanripa Senecio, -yuq a suffix) is a mountain in the Urubamba mountain range in the Andes of Peru, about  high. It is located in the Cusco Region, Urubamba Province, Ollantaytambo District. It lies southwest of Patacancha and northwest of Salcayoc.

References 

Mountains of Peru
Mountains of Cusco Region